Sanda Loko is a chiefdom of Bombali District in the Northern Province of Sierra Leone. The principal town lies at Kamalo.  As of 2004, the chiefdom has a population of 27,667.

References

Chiefdoms of Sierra Leone
Northern Province, Sierra Leone